Tolar Independent School District is a public school district based in Tolar, Texas, United States.

In addition to Tolar, the district also serves the community of Paluxy.

In 2009, the school district was rated "academically acceptable" by the Texas Education Agency.

Schools
Tolar High/Junior High School (grades 6-12)
Tolar Elementary School (prekindergarten-grade 5)

References

External links
Tolar ISD
City of Tolar, Texas - Official Website.

School districts in Hood County, Texas